Borisovka is a rural locality in Gorodensky Selsoviet Rural Settlement, Lgovsky District, Kursk Oblast, Russia. Population:

Geography 
The village is located on the Sukhaya Rechitsa River (a right tributary of the Seym), 53 km from the Russia–Ukraine border, 51.5 km south-west of Kursk, 13 km north-east of the district center – the town Lgov, 5 km from the selsoviet center – Gorodensk.

 Climate
Borisovka has a warm-summer humid continental climate (Dfb in the Köppen climate classification).

Transport 
Borisovka is located 6 km from the road of regional importance  (Kursk – Lgov – Rylsk – border with Ukraine) as part of the European route E38, on the road of intermunicipal significance  (Lgov – Gorodensk – Borisovka – Rechitsa), 6 km from the nearest railway halt 412 km (railway line Lgov I — Kursk).

The rural locality is situated 58 km from Kursk Vostochny Airport, 137 km from Belgorod International Airport and 262 km from Voronezh Peter the Great Airport.

References

Notes

Sources

Rural localities in Lgovsky District